Everready (The Religion) is the fifth studio album by rapper Tech N9ne. The album was released in 2006 as a "Collector's Edition" CD that contains a second CD featuring 14 songs from Tech N9ne as well as other Strange Music artists. "Jellysickle" & "My Wife, My Bitch, My Girl" also appeared on the 25 To Life video game soundtrack, while a censored version of "The Beast" was featured on the soundtrack to Madden NFL 06, released in 2005. In 2010, the song "Riot Maker" was used by Total Nonstop Action Wrestling (TNA) as the official theme for their Hard Justice pay-per-view. The album debuted at #50 on the Billboard 200 with 22,000 copies sold in its first week. The song "Caribou Lou" was later certified Gold in 2012, and certified platinum later in 2017.

Eminem was originally set to appear on the track "My World" with Tech N9ne and Brotha Lynch but complications with his best friend Proof being killed led him to not being able to record his verse, so Dalima took over his spot on the album. Twista was originally supposed set to be appeared on "Welcome To The Midwest," but his recorded verse wasn't sent to Tech in time to be fully mastered without delaying the album. Tech says he still plans to use the verse in the future.

Track listing

Disc one

Disc two: Strange Music Library

Bonus tracks

Copies purchased from Trans World Entertainment-owned stores contained a promotional code allowing the download of this track for free.

Samples
No Can Do
"I Can't Go For That (No Can Do)" by Hall & Oates
Welcome to the Midwest
"Sway" by Dean Martin
Bout Ta' Bubble
"Beat Box II" by Art Of Noise
The Rain
"Rain" (from the Cowboy Bebop soundtrack) by Yoko Kanno & The Seatbelts

Charts

Certifications

References

2006 albums
Tech N9ne albums
Albums produced by Rick Rock
Albums produced by The Legendary Traxster
Albums produced by Seven (record producer)
Strange Music albums